Varbitsa is a village in northern Bulgaria, part of Pleven Province, Pleven Municipality, 13 km north-east from Pleven city. 

As per the census of 1st of February 2011, the village has a population of 530 inhabitants.

References

Villages in Pleven Province